This is a list of members of the Irish Republican Army. It is broken down in sub-lists of various organisations known as the IRA

Irish War of Independence: 1917-1922

A
Frank Aiken (1898–1983), a founding member of  Fianna Fáil; commanded the Fourth Northern Division of the Irish Republican Army (IRA) during the War of Independence. Aiken was first elected to Dáil Éireann in 1923 and would remain in politics until 1973.
Todd Andrews (1901–1985), a member of the Irish Volunteers serving in the Irish War of Independence and participated in a 10-day hunger strike in 1920. He was later interned during the Irish Civil War after siding with Anti-Treaty forces before becoming a civil servant in his later years, most prominently as chairman of the Irish transport company, Córas Iompair Éireann.

B
Richard Barrett (1899–1922), Irish Republican officer who was executed by the Free State during the following Civil War.
Kevin Barry (1902–1920)
Tom Barry (1897–1980), a prominent figure on the Irish Republican Army during the Irish War of Independence and the Irish Civil War. Although fighting with Anti-Treaty forces, he was briefly expelled from the organisation until the 1930s and was later involved in politics and writing.
Piaras Béaslaí (1881–1965), a member of the Irish Republican Brotherhood who participated in the infiltration of the Gaelic League and fought in the Easter Rising and Irish War of Independence. He was later involved in the Sinn Féin political party and writing.
Dan Breen (1894–1969), an early member of the Irish Volunteers and served as leader of the Irish Republican Army during the Irish War of Independence. He would later become a prominent figure in Fianna Fáil.
George Brent (1899–1979), an American actor who acted as a courier during Irish War of Independence.
Eamon Broy (1887–1972), an officer in the Dublin Metropolitan Police acting as a double agent during Irish War of Independence. He later served as Garda Commissioner during the mid-1930s.
Cathal Brugha (1874–1922), former British soldier active in the Easter Rising, the Anglo-Irish War, and the Irish Civil War.
Robert Byrne (1899–1919), trade unionist and IRA member killed in the Irish War of Independence.

C
Michael Carolan (1875-1930), Director of Intelligence from 1922 to 1925
Charles Carrigan (1882–1916), a member of the Irish Republican Brotherhood and served as Chairman of Sinn Féin's first cumann in Scotland before his death during the Easter Rising.
Erskine Childers (1870–1922), British author involved in gunrunning and later member of Sinn Féin.  Secretary-general of the Irish delegation during negotiation of the Anglo-Irish Treaty.
Joe Clarke (1882–1976), remained active in Sinn Féin until his death.
Michael Collins (1890–1922), Director of Intelligence for the IRA during the Irish War of Independence and served as Commander-In-Chief of the Irish National Army
Andy Cooney (d. 1968), a member of the Third Battalion of the Dublin Brigade and a suspected participant in the execution of the Cairo Gang
Timothy Coughlin (d. 1928), a member of the Dublin Brigade during the War of Independence who assassinated the Vice President of the Executive Council, Kevin O'Higgins.

D
Paddy Daly
Liam Deasy
Archie Doyle
Patrick Doyle (1892–1921), convicted of treason and executed following his participation in a failed ambush at Drumcondra on January 21, 1921.
Edward Dorins Killed at Battle of Custom House, 25/05/1921. Shot outside the building in Beresford Place while attacking an approaching tender full of Auxiliaries.
Eamonn Duggan

F
Stephen Fuller (d. 1984), a member of the Irish Republican Army (IRA) during the Irish War of Independence and fought with Anti-Treaty forces during the Irish Civil War (1922–23). He would later serve as a member of Fianna Fáil during the 1930s.

G
Bill Gannon
George Gilmore

H
Sean Hales
Tom Hales
Seán Hogan
Charlie Hurley

K
Sean P. Keating (1903–1976) Irish Republican Army member who fought for Anti-Treaty forces during Irish Civil War, later became Deputy Mayor of New York City.
Paddy Killoran (1903-1965) Famed fiddle player, band leader and recording artist. Volunteer in the 3rd Sligo Battalion during the war of independence.

L
Seán Lemass
Liam Lynch
 Dinny Lacey

M
Seán MacBride
Seán Mac Eoin
Seán MacEntee
Terence MacSwiney
Tom Maguire
Dick McKee
Joe McKelvey
Paddy McLogan
Liam Mellows
Seán Moylan
Patrick Moylett
Richard Mulcahy

O
Seamus O'Donovan
Diarmuid O'Hegarty
Frank O'Connor
Rory O'Connor
Peadar O'Donnell
Florence O'Donoghue
Dan O'Donovan
Eoin O'Duffy
Ernie O'Malley
Gearóid O'Sullivan

P
Liam Pilkington

R
Seán Russell
P. J. Ruttledge
Tommy Ryan
Séumas Robinson

S
Martin Savage
Austin Stack

T
Liam Tobin
Oscar Traynor
Thomas Traynor
Seán Treacy
Moss Twomey

The Official Irish Republican Army & Post-Independence: 1922-present

A
Gerry Adams Sr.
Frank Aiken
Todd Andrews

B
Peter Barnes
Tom Barry
Brendan Behan
Dominic Behan
Dan Breen
Cathal Brugha

C
Joe Cahill
Erskine Childers
Seamus Costello
Timothy Coughlin
Seán Cronin

D
Liam Deasy
Paddy Devlin
Archie Doyle

F
Mick Fitzpatrick
Stephen Fuller

G
Bill Gannon
Seán Garland
George Gilmore
Cathal Goulding

H
Tom Hales
Thomas Harte (Irish Republican)
Seán Harrington
Stephen Hayes
 Seán Hogan

J
John Graham

K
Dan Keating
Liam Kelly
Pearse Kelly (Paul Kelso) 
Charlie Kerins

L
Seán Lemass
Liam Lynch
 Dinny Lacey

M
Proinsias MacAirt
Tomás MacCurtain, commanding officer IRA members interned at Curragh Military Prison during the 1950s.
Tomás Mac Giolla
Seán Mac Stíofáin
Seán MacBride
Seán MacEntee
Tony Magan
Tom Maguire
Hugh McAteer
Joe McCann
Seán McCaughey
Seán McCool
John Joe McGirl
Charlie McGlade
Patrick McGrath (Irish Republican)
Billy McKee
Joe McKelvey
Billy McMillen
Liam Mellows
Seán Moylan

O
Ruairí Ó Brádaigh
Dáithí Ó Conaill
Denis O'Brien
Seamus O'Donovan
Frank O'Connor
Rory O'Connor
Peadar O'Donnell
Dan O'Donovan
Fergal O'Hanlon
Ernie O'Malley
Michael O'Riordan

P
Proinsias De Rossa

R
Seán Russell
P. J. Ruttledge
Frank Ryan

S
Seamus Robinson
Seán South
Austin Stack
Jimmy Steele

T
Oscar Traynor
Moss Twomey
Seamus Twomey

W
Tom Williams

Irish Republican Army: 1969-present
This list includes members of the Provisional IRA as well as subsequent splinter groups including the Continuity IRA and the Real IRA.

A
Paddy Agnew (born 1955)
Martina Anderson (born 1962)

B
Thomas Begley (1970–1993), member of the Belfast Brigade; blew himself up in the Shankill Road bombing which killed nine other people.
Ivor Bell
Séanna Breathnach (born 1957)
Charles Breslin (1964-1985), killed by undercover British Army members
Rosena Brown (b. 1945), Belfast actress and IRA Intelligence Officer. Was named in 1990 murder trial of Maze prison officer John Hanna. Received a 20-year prison sentence in 1993 after a booby-trap bomb was found in her possession.

C
Joe Cahill (1920-2004)
Liam Campbell
Fergal Caraher (1970-1990), killed by Royal Marines
Malachy Carey, killed by Loyalists in late 1992
Owen Carron (born 1953)
Peter Cleary (1950-1976), shot dead by SAS
Kevin Coen (1947-1975), killed by British Army members
Eamon Collins (1954-1999), became an informant in the late 1980s and was stabbed to death at his home in Northern Ireland
Colombia Three (Niall Connolly, James Monaghan, Martin McCauley)
Eddie Copeland
Marion Coyle (born 1954), took part in the kidnapping of Dr. Tiede Herrema

D
Seamus Daly
Matt Devlin (1950-2005), took part in the 1981 IRA hunger strike and later became a leading member of the Sinn Féin party
Kieran Doherty (1955-1981), died in the 1981 hunger strike after lasting 73 days
Hugh Doherty
Joe Doherty (born 1955)
Martin Doherty (1958-1994), shot dead preventing a bombing by the Ulster Volunteer Force
Pat Doherty (born 1945)
Denis Donaldson (1950-2006), became an informant and was shot dead by the Real Irish Republican Army
Rose Dugdale (born 1941)

E
Dessie Ellis (born 1953)

F
Mairéad Farrell (1957-1988), killed by SAS soldiers
Hugh Feeney (born 1951)
Martin Ferris (born 1952)
Kieran Fleming (1959-1984), drowned
William Fleming (1965-1984), killed by SAS soldiers
Bernard Fox (born 1951)
Kevin Fulton
Angelo Fusco (born 1956)

G
Michael Gaughan (1949-1974)
Brian Gillen (born 1970)
Raymond Gilmour (born 1959)
John Francis Green (1946-1975), shot dead by Loyalists
Dessie Grew (1953-1990), killed by undercover British Army members
Seamus Grew (1951/52-1982), killed by Northern Ireland police officers

H
Brendan Hughes (1948-2008), best known as the organiser and leader of the 1980 hunger strike
Francis Hughes (1956-1981), died during the hunger strikes
Sean Hughes
Martin Hurson (1956-1981), died in the hunger strikes

K
Brian Keenan (1942-2008)
Gerry Kelly (born 1953)
Sean Kelly (born 1972)

L
Jim Lynagh (1956-1987), killed by SAS soldiers
Martin Lynch

M

Patrick Magee (born 1951)
Paul Magee (born 1948)
Donna Maguire (born 1967)
Larry Marley (1946-1987), shot and killed by Loyalists
Alex Maskey (born 1952)
Proinsias MacAirt (1922-1992)
Pearse McAuley (born 1965)
Daniel McCann (1957-1988), killed by Special Branch officers in Belfast
Martin McCaughey (1967-1990), shot dead by undercover British Army members
Raymond McCreesh (1957-1981), died during the hunger strikes
Joe McDonnell (1951-1981), died during the hunger strikes
Séamus McElwaine (1960-1986), killed by SAS soldiers while his fellow IRA friend was severely injured
Thomas McElwee (1957-1981), died during the hunger strikes
Brendan McFarlane (born 1951)
Martin McGartland (born 1970)
Gerry McGeough (born 1958)
Pat McGeown (1956-1996)
Antoine Mac Giolla Bhrighde (1957-1984), killed by British Army troops
Bernard McGinn (1957-2013)
John Joe McGirl (1921-1988)
Dominic McGlinchey (1954-1994), later became a leader of the INLA. Shot dead by unknown assailants.
Kevin McGrady (born 1956)
Martin McGuinness (1950-2017)
Anthony McIntyre
Pádraig McKearney (1954-1987), killed in an ambush by SAS soldiers
Tommy McKearney (born 1952)
Billy McKee
Kevin McKenna Former Chief of Staff of the Provisional IRA
Laurence McKeown (born 1956)
Michael McKevitt (born 1949)
Thomas McMahon (born 1948)
Joseph MacManus (1970-1992), killed by Loyalists
Jackie McMullan (born 1955)
Danny McNamee (born 1960)
Eoin McNamee
Seán Mac Stíofáin (1928-2001)
Michael McVerry (1949-1973), killed by British Army
Martin Meehan (1945-2007)
Arthur Morgan (born 1954)
Danny Morrison (born 1953)
Conor Murphy (born 1963)
Thomas Murphy (born 1949)
Michael Murray (1936-1999)
Sean Murray

N
Kieran Nugent (1958-2000)

O
Ruairí Ó Brádaigh (1932-2013)
Dáithí Ó Conaill (1938-1991)
Phil O'Donnell (1932-1982)
Éamonn O'Doherty (1939-1999)
Sean O'Callaghan (born 1954)
Siobhán O'Hanlon (1963-2006)
Dessie O'Hare (born 1956)
Diarmuid O'Neill (1969-1996), shot and killed by London Metropolitan Police officers

P
Dolours Price (1951-2013)
Marian Price (born 1954)

Q
Liam Quinn (born 1949)
Paddy Quinn (born 1962)
Nessan Quinlivan (born 1965)

R
Billy Reid (1939-1971), killed by British Army members

S
Bobby Sands (1954–1981), a member of the Provisional IRA later elected as a Member of Parliament during the 1981 Irish Hunger Strike at Long Kesh.
Seán Savage (1965–1988), a member of the Provisional IRA killed by members of the British Special Air Service (SAS) during Operation Flavius.
Freddie Scappaticci (b. 1946), an alleged member of the Provisional IRA who is supposed to have acted as double agent under the alias Stakeknife.
Frank Stagg (1948–1976), a member of the Provisional Irish Republican Army who participated in several hunger strikes after his imprisonment in 1973 and later died during a hunger strike at Wakefield Prison.
Jimmy Steele (b. 1907-1970), fought during the Irish War of Independence as a member of the Fianna and remained active with the republican movement until his death in August 1970
Bobby Storey, recruiter of the Provisional IRA in Belfast and suspected head of intelligence to the IRA Army Council.

T
Matt Treacy, member of the Dublin Brigade, operating from inside Leinster House.
Seamus Twomey (1911–1989), served twice as Chief of Staff for the Provisional IRA.
Gerard Tuite (born 1955), senior IRA figure in the late 1970s/early 1980s.

References

Irish Republican Army (1919–1922)
Irish Republican Army members
 
 
 
 
IRA members